The Bay of San Miguel is a bay of the Gulf of Panama, located on the Pacific coast of Darién Province in eastern Panama.

It is fed by the Tuira River. At its southern end is Cape Garachiné (also known as Point Garachina), and at its northern end is Punta San Lorenzo (a.k.a. Cape Gardo).

See also
 

San Miguel
San Miguel, Panama
Landforms of Darién Province
Gulf of Panama
Panamanian coasts of the Pacific Ocean